Blattabacterium is a genus of obligate mutualistic endosymbiont bacteria that are believed to inhabit all species of cockroach studied to date, with the exception of the genus Nocticola. The genus' presence in the termite Mastotermes darwiniensis led to speculation, later confirmed, that termites and cockroaches are evolutionarily linked.

Diversity 
B. cuenoti was traditionally considered the only species in the genus Blattabacterium, which is in turn the only genus in the family Blattabacteriaceae. However, three new species have been described hosted by different species of cockroaches in the genus Cryptocercus:
 Blattabacterium relictus in Cryptocercus relictus
 B. clevelandi in C. clevelandi, and
 B. punctulatus in C. darwini, C. garciai, C. punctulatus and C. wrighti.

The ancient (~150 My) genus retains throughout a core set of metabolic genes. According to the GTDB, the many strains of the genus have nevertheless diverged enough at the sequence level to define around 40 "species" out of B. cuenoti alone.

In addition, newer genera have been found sufficiently closely related to the genus to warrant assignment to the same family by GTDB: Ca. "Karelsulcia", Ca. "Uzinura", Ca. "Walczuchella", all symbionts of insects.

Function 
Blattabacterium lives inside the fat cells of the fat bodies (tissues in the abdominal cavity that store fat) of its insect hosts. It serves a vital role in nitrogen recycling, which is important in insects that mainly live on plant material such as wood, which are poor in nitrogen. In insects, uric acid is a waste product of protein metabolism. After breakdown of uric acid by the host (and its other microbial flora, such as gut bacteria and fungi) into urea and/or ammonia, blattabacterium recycles nitrogen by converting these products into glutamate, and using other raw materials from the host, is able to synthesize all of the essential amino acids and several vitamins. It appears to be transmitted to succeeding generations of the host by infection of the mother's eggs prior to  their fertilization.

References

Further reading

Flavobacteria
Bacteria genera